Please add names of notable painters with a Wikipedia page, in precise English alphabetical order, using U.S. spelling conventions. Country and regional names refer to where painters worked for long periods, not to personal allegiances.

Arun Pandey,(born 2005 Gorakhpur),(2017-2020) (1St international painter)
Marion Wachtel (1875–1954), American painter
Yoshihiko Wada (和田義彦, born 1940), Japanese painter
Alfons Walde (1891–1958), Austrian painter and architect
Hilda Annetta Walker (1877–1860), English painter and sculptor
Karl Walser (1877–1943), Swiss painter, designer and illustrator
Edward Wadsworth (1889–1949), English painter, engraver and camouflage designer
Lionel Walden (1861–1933), American painter
Ada Hill Walker (1879–1955), Scottish painter and scientific illustrator
Zygmunt Waliszewski (1897–1936), Polish painter
Ottilie Maclaren Wallace (1875–1947), Scottish sculptor
Alfred Wallis (1855–1942), English artist and fisherman
Henry Wallis (1830–1916), English painter, writer and collector
Kathleen Walne (1915–2011), English watercolor painter
Cecile Walton (1891–1956), Scottish painter, illustrator and sculptor
Edward Arthur Walton (1860–1922), Scottish painter
Wang Duo (王铎, 1592–1652), Chinese calligrapher, painter and poet
Wang E (王谔, 1465–1545), Chinese imperial painter
Wang Fu (王紱, 1362–1416), Chinese calligrapher, painter and poet
Wang Guxiang (王谷祥, 1501–1568), Chinese painter
Wang Hui (王翬, 1632–1717), Chinese painter
Wang Jian (王鑒, 1598–1677), Chinese painter
Wang Lü (王履, born 1332), Chinese painter, calligrapher and poet
Wang Meng (王蒙, 1308–1385), Chinese 
Wang Mian (王冕, 1287–1359), Chinese painter and poet
Wang Shimin (王時敏, 1592–1680), Chinese painter
Wang Shishen (1686–1759), Chinese painter and calligrapher
Victor Wang (born 1956), Chinese/American painter and professor
Wang Wei (王維, 699–759), Chinese painter, poet and musician
Wang Wu (王武, 1632–1690), Chinese painter and poet
Wang Ximeng (王希孟, 1096–1119), Chinese court painter
Wang Yi (王繹, born 1333), Chinese painter
Wang Yuan (王淵, late 13th or 14th c.), Chinese painter
Wang Yuanqi (王原祁, 1642–1715), Chinese painter
Wang Zhenpeng (王振鵬, fl. 1280–1329), Chinese imperial painter
Wang Zhongyu (王仲玉, fl. 14th c.), Chinese painter
Walenty Wańkowicz (1799–1842), Polish painter
Joan Warburton (1920–1996), English artist
Everett Warner (1877–1963), American painter, print-maker and camouflage artist
Laura Wheeler Waring (1887–1948), American artist and educator
Andy Warhol (1928–1987), American artist and film director
Watanabe Kazan (渡辺崋山, 1793–1841), Japanese painter, scholar and statesman
Sadao Watanabe (渡辺禎雄, 1913–1996), Japanese print-maker
Watanabe Shōtei (渡辺省亭, 1851–1918), Japanese nihonga painter
Shōzaburō Watanabe (渡辺庄三郎, 1885–1962), Japanese print-maker
John William Waterhouse (1849–1917), English painter
Billie Waters (1896–1979), English artist
Alison Watt (born 1965), Scottish painter
George Fiddes Watt (1873–1960), Scottish painter and engraver
James Cromar Watt (1862–1940), Scottish artist, architect and jeweler
Jean Antoine Watteau (1684–1721), French painter
George Frederic Watts (1817–1904), English painter and sculptor
Henrik Weber (1818–1866), Hungarian painter
Stokely Webster (1912–2001), American painter
Jan Baptist Weenix (1621 – c. 1660), Dutch painter
Gerda Wegener (1886–1940), Danish illustrator and painter
Carel Weight (1908–1997), English painter
Susan Weil (born 1930), American artist
J. Alden Weir (1852–1919), American painter
John Ellsworth Weis (1892–1962), American painter
Samuel Washington Weis (1870–1956), American painter, sketcher and cotton broker
Jerry Weiss (born 1959), American painter and writer
Wojciech Weiss (1875–1950), Polish painter and draftsman
Neil Welliver (1929–2005), American painter
Margaret Bruce Wells (1909–1998), Scottish/English woodcut and lino-cut artist
Albert Welti (1862–1912), Swiss painter and etcher
Albert J. Welti (1894–1965), Swiss painter and writer
Wen Boren (文伯仁, 1502–1575), Chinese painter
Wen Jia (文嘉, 1501–1583), Chinese painter
Wen Tong (文同, 1019–1079), Chinese painter
Wen Zhengming (文徵明, 1470–1559), Chinese painter, calligrapher and poet
Wen Zhenheng (文震亨, 1585–1645), Chinese painter, scholar and garden designer
Kurt Wenner (living), American pavement artist
Marianne von Werefkin (1860–1938), Russian/German painter
Adriaen van der Werff (1659–1722), Dutch painter
Pieter van der Werff (1665–1722), Dutch painter
Joseph Werner (1637–1710), Swiss painter and miniaturist
Adolf Ulric Wertmüller (1751–1811), Swedish/American painter
Tom Wesselmann (1931–2004), American painter, collagist and sculptor
Benjamin West (1738–1820), American/English painter
William Edward West (1788–1859), American painter
Konstantin Westchilov (1877–1945), Russian/American painter
Katerina Wilczynski (1894–1978), Polish/English artist
Jacob Willemszoon de Wet (c. 1610 – 1675/1691), Dutch painter
Rogier van der Weyden (1399–1464), Netherlandish painter
Edith Grace Wheatley (1888–1970), English painter
John Laviers Wheatley (1892–1955), Welsh painter
Bessie Wheeler (born 1876), American painter
James McNeill Whistler (1834–1903), American/English artist
Dee Whitcomb (born 1967), American artist
Brett Whiteley (1939–1992), Australian artist
Félix Bódog Widder (1874–1939), Hungarian painter and graphic designer
Charmion von Wiegand (1896–1983), American painter, writer and critic
Hans Beat Wieland (1867–1945), Swiss painter
Cornelis Claesz van Wieringen (1576–1633), Dutch painter
Antoine Wiertz (1806–1865), Belgian painter and sculptor
Bjørn Wiinblad (1918–2006), Danish painter, designer and ceramicist
Thomas Wijck (1616–1677), Dutch painter
Jan Wijnants (1632–1684), Dutch painter
Jerry Wilkerson (1943–2007), American artist
David Wilkie (1785–1841), Scottish/English painter
Abraham Willaerts (1603–1669), Dutch painter
Adam Willaerts (1577–1664), Dutch painter
Adolphe Willette (1857–1926), French painter, caricaturist and lithographer
Bedwyr Williams (born 1974), Welsh artist and comedian
Charles Williams (born 1965), English painter and teacher
Christopher Williams (1873–1934), Welsh artist
David Dougal Williams (1888–1944), English/Scottish artist and teacher
Hugh William Williams (1773–1829), Scottish painter
Ivor Williams (1908–1982), Welsh artist
Kyffin Williams (1918–2006), Welsh painter
Neil Williams (1934–1988), American painter
Penry Williams (1802–1885), Welsh/Italian painter
Harold Sandys Williamson (1892–1978), English painter
Carel Willink (1900–1983), Dutch painter
Thornton Willis (born 1936), American painter and teacher
Jens Ferdinand Willumsen (1863–1958), Danish painter, sculptor and architect
Donald Roller Wilson (born 1938), American painter
Richard Wilson (1713–1782), Welsh painter
Franz Xaver Winterhalter (1805–1873), German painter and lithographer
Sylvia Wishart (1936–2008), Scottish painter
Stanisław Witkiewicz (1855–1915), Polish painter, theorist and architect
Stanisław Ignacy Witkiewicz (1885–1939) Polish painter, writer and photographer
Emanuel de Witte (1617–1692), Dutch painter
Caspar van Wittel (1653–1736), Dutch/Italian painter and draftsman
Uwe Wittwer (born 1954), Swiss artist
Emanuel Witz (1717–1797), Swiss painter
Konrad Witz (1410–1446), Swiss painter
Henry Otto Wix (1866–1922), German/American painter
David Wojnarowicz (1954–1992), Polish painter, illustrator and print-maker
Kazimierz Wojniakowski (1772–1812), Polish painter, illustrator and Freemason
Witold Wojtkiewicz (1879–1909), Polish painter, illustrator and print-maker
Caspar Wolf (1735–1783), Swiss painter
Adolf Wölfli (1864–1930), Swiss artist
John Wollaston (fl. 1742–1775), English/American painter
John Wonnacott (born 1940), English painter
Toss Woollaston (1910–1998), New Zealand painter
Christopher Wood (1901–1930), English painter
Grant Wood (1891–1942), American painter
Leona Wood (1921–2008), American painter, dancer and writer
Ursula Wood (1868–1925), English artist and illustrator
Charles H. Woodbury (1864–1940), American painter
William Woodward (1859–1939), American artist and educator
Henry Woods (1846–1921), English painter and illustrator
Thomas Frederick Worrall (1872–1957), English painter and politician
Troels Wörsel (born 1950), Danish painter
Philips Wouwerman (1619–1668), Dutch painter
Cindy Wright (born 1972), Belgian painter
John Michael Wright (1617–1694), Scottish/English painter
Joseph Wright of Derby (1734–1797), English painter
Andrzej Wróblewski (1927–1957), Polish painter
Peter Wtewael (1596–1660), Dutch painter
JoWOnder (living), English painter, animator and writer
Wu Bin (吳彬, fl. late 16th, early 17th century), Chinese painter and Buddhist monk
Wu Changshuo (吳昌碩, 1844–1927), Chinese painter, calligrapher and seal artist
Wu Daozi (吳道子, 680 – c. 760), Chinese painter
Wu Guanzhong (吳冠中, 1919–2010), Chinese painter
Wu Hong (吳宏, fl. between 17th and 19th centuries), Chinese painter and ink-bamboo artist
Wu Li (吳歷, 1632–1718), Chinese painter, calligrapher and poet
Wu Shixian (吳石仙, died c. 1916), Chinese painter
Wu Wei (吳偉, 1459–1508), Chinese painter
Wu Zhen (吳鎮, 1280–1354), Chinese painter
Wu Zuoren (吴作人, 1908–1997), Chinese painter
Paul Wunderlich (born 1927), German painter, sculptor and graphic artist
Wuzhun Shifan (無準師範, 1178–1249), Chinese painter, calligrapher and Zen Buddhist monk
Nathan Wyburn (born 1989), Welsh artist and media personality
Jan Wyck (1652–1700), Dutch painter
Leon Wyczółkowski (1852–1936), Polish painter and academy professor
Andrew Wyeth (1917–2009), American visual artist
Henriette Wyeth (1907–1997), American painter
Jamie Wyeth (born 1946), American painter
N. C. Wyeth (1882–1945), American artist and illustrator
George Wyllie (1921–2012), Scottish artist and sculptor
Stanisław Wyspiański (1869–1907), Polish painter, interior designer and poet
Juliette Wytsman (1866–1925), Belgian painter
Rodolphe Wytsman (1860–1927), Belgian painter

References
References can be found under each entry.

W